Tylenchorhynchus phaseoli is a plant pathogenic nematode infecting pearl millet.

References

External links 
 Nemaplex, University of California - Tylenchorhynchus phaseoli

Agricultural pest nematodes
Pearl millet diseases
Tylenchida